Roman Andreyevich Zharikov (born 25 January 1991) is a former Russian football forward.

Career
Zharikov made his professional debut for FC Tom Tomsk on 15 July 2009 in the Russian Cup game against FC Alania Vladikavkaz.

External links
 
 
 

1991 births
Sportspeople from Tomsk
Living people
Russian footballers
Association football forwards
FC Tom Tomsk players
FC Khimik Dzerzhinsk players